Hilloawmahad is a town in the central Hiran region of Somalia.

References
Hillo Aw Mahad

Populated places in Hiran, Somalia